State Route 308 (SR 308) is a northwest-southeast state highway located in the southwest part of the U.S. state of Georgia. Its route is entirely within Sumter County.

Route description
SR 308 begins at an intersection with SR 45 in the southwestern part of Plains. The route heads southeast out of the city along South Bond Street. It continues southeast through rural portions of the county, passing Salters Mill Road. Farther along, it has an intersection with SR 49. The highway continues southeast, and then turns easterly until it meets its eastern terminus, an intersection with US 19/SR 3 northwest of Smithville.

Major intersections

See also

References

External links

308
Transportation in Sumter County, Georgia